The 1992 United States Senate election in Hawaii took place on November 3, 1992, alongside other elections to the United States Senate in other states as well as elections to the United States House of Representatives and various state and local elections. Incumbent Democratic U.S. Senator Daniel Inouye won re-election to a sixth term.

General election

Candidates
 Daniel Inouye, incumbent U.S. Senator (Democratic)
 Linda Martin (Green)
 Rick Reed, state senator (Republican)
Richard O. Rowland (Libertarian)

Results

See also
 1992 United States Senate elections

References

1992 Hawaii elections
1992
Hawaii
Daniel Inouye